HMS Cruizer was a 17-gun wooden screw sloop, the name-ship of the  of the Royal Navy, launched at the Royal Dockyard, Deptford in 1852. The spelling of her name was formally altered to  HMS Cruiser in 1857. She became a sail training vessel in 1872 and was renamed HMS Lark.  She was eventually sold for breaking in 1912.

History

Her first years of service were spent on the China station, during which a party of her crew took part in the Battle of Fatshan Creek in 1857. Her commander, Charles Fellowes, was the first man over the walls of Canton when the city was taken, and the ship saw further action on the Yangtse river, including the attack on the Taku Forts on the Peiho river in 1858.

On 20 November 1858, she was in the company of Her Majesty's Ships Furious, Retribution, Dove and Lee. The squadron were conveying the Earl of Elgin on the Yang-Tse-Kiang, when they had to engage with the Tae-Ping Rebels at Nanking.

In 1860, under the command of John Bythesea she surveyed the Gulf of Pechili to prepare moorings for the Allied fleet to disembark troops for the advance on Peking.

Cruiser was laid up in England in 1867, before being recommissioned for the Mediterranean station.

Disposal

In 1872, having had her guns and engine removed, she became a sail training ship and was renamed Lark, in which capacity she served until at least 1903. She was finally sold for breaking up at Malta in 1912.

Notes

References

External links

 

Cruizer-class sloops
Victorian-era sloops of the United Kingdom
Ships built in Deptford
1852 ships
Crimean War naval ships of the United Kingdom